The Shadow Ministry of John Brogden was the opposition led by John Brogden MLA, opposing the Carr government of the Labor Party in the Parliament of New South Wales. The shadow cabinet was made up of members of the Liberal Party and the National Party of Australia in a Coalition agreement. 

Brogden led from the majority Coalition partner, the Liberal Party and served as leader of the opposition from 28 March 2002 to 1 September 2005. The minority Coalition partner, the National Party was led by Andrew Stoner MLA for the majority of this period.

Arrangement

See also
2003 New South Wales state election
Shadow Ministry of Kerry Chikarovski
Shadow Ministry of Peter Debnam
Third Carr ministry
Fourth Carr ministry
First Iemma ministry

References

Liberal Party of Australia
National Party of Australia
2002 establishments in Australia
2005 disestablishments in Australia
New South Wales-related lists
Brogden